Erect the Youth Problem is the only studio album released by American punk trio Wives. It was released in 2004 via Cold Sweat Records.

Track listing
 "4X4" - 1:09
 "Babies" - 1:34
 "Mountainous" - 2:04
 "We Came Out Like Tigers" - 1:39
 "All Dads Alike" - 1:49
 "Boys Club" - 4:54
 "I've Got This One Partner" - 2:14
 "Wasted Again, Again" - 1:36
 "Squeeze Your Eyes So Tight" - 1:06
 "Mother Russia" - 1:30
 "The Big Idea" - 2:47
 "Lunch Money" - 1:22
 "We'd Never Assume That" -2:00
 "Brickface" - 2:00

References 

2004 albums